The  is a Gymnasium in Konstanz, Baden-Württemberg, Germany.

The eponym is Alexander von Humboldt (1769–1859). The school has approximately 82 teachers and 985 students.

Partnership and exchange of pupils 
Alexander-von-Humboldt-Gymnasium has an annual exchange of pupils with its twin towns Richmond (Great Britain) and Fontainebleau (France). Pupils of several secondary schools in Konstanz visit every two years the Czech twin town of Tábor. Every year a three-week stay in Orange County, California in The United States of America is offered.

External links 

 Official website of 

Schools in Baden-Württemberg

Gymnasiums in Germany
Educational institutions established in 1830
1830 establishments in Baden